Chibok is a Local Government Area of Borno State, Nigeria, located in the southern part of the state. It has its headquarters in the town of Chibok.

Landscape 
It has an area of 1,350 km²

Population
It has a population of 66,105 at the 2006 census, who are majorly Kibaku people.

Language 

Most of the villages including mbalala were all speaking the Kibaku language.

History 
It is one of the sixteen LGAs that constitute the Borno Emirate, a traditional state in Borno State, northwest Nigeria.

In January 2015, the BringBackOurGirls group aired concerns over plans by the Independent National Electoral Commission (INEC) to exclude Chibok and some communities currently under the control of jihadist group Boko Haram from receiving permanent voter cards (PVCs) for the 2015 general election.

Boko Haram 
In April 2014, nearly 300 girls, most of whom were Christian, were abducted from Chibok by Boko Haram.

In May 2014, Boko Haram attacked Chibok again.

In November 2014, it was reported that Boko Haram had taken control of the town and implemented Sharia law. The military announced a few days later that they had recaptured the town.

References

Further reading 

Local Government Areas in Borno State
Populated places in Borno State